Farid Isfarayini (died after 1264) was a Persian poet of the 13th-century, who served at the court of the Salghurids in Shiraz.

References

Sources 
 

13th-century Iranian writers
Year of birth unknown
Year of death unknown
Poets of the Salghurids